Desh Ka Bhavishya is the second and the final volume of Yashpal's Jhutha Sach. It is based on the events surrounding the Partition of India. It was originally published in 1960 in India.

References

1960 novels
Books about politics of India
Partition of India in fiction
Hindi-language novels
Rajkamal Prakashan books